Pathram is a 1999 Indian Malayalam-language political thriller film  written by Renji Panicker and directed by Joshi, starring Suresh Gopi, Manju Warrier, Murali, N. F. Varghese, Biju Menon, Abhirami.

Plot 
Nandagopal, an associate editor with one of the leading newspapers Kerala Reshmi, is an aggressive and daring journalist who enjoys a reputation among the media circle, and is the son of Venugopal, an iconic journalist who was killed by the textile mafia for being a staunch supporter of trade unions. In Kochi, Nandan meets Shekaran, an old naxalite and his father's friend, who is running Jagratha, a newspaper which is feared by the hypocritical political class. Shekaran's outspoken and belligerent nature had earned him more enemies than friends, and is constantly fighting Vishwanathan, an estranged ideological disciple of Shekaran who rules the city with his money and power.

Vishwanathan holds a large share in Kerala Reshmi (acquired through deceit) and enjoys a huge political clout at state and central levels. C.I Haridas, a close friend of Shekaran, informs him about a vital source to collect evidences against Vishwanathan. Shekaran decides to expose Vishwanathan's role in the murder of Vincent Peter and numerous other crimes, by publishing the confessions made by a henchman of Vishwanathan. The plan is revealed to Vishwanathan by a key journalist in Jagratha effectively double crossing Shekaran. A bomb explosion orchestrated by Vishwanathan eliminates Shekaran and C.I Haridas.

Jagratha, the newspaper run by Shekaran is inherited by Devika Shekar, the only daughter of Shekaran, who is a fiery journalist like her father. Nandan, who was very close to Sekharan, manages to ensure that the case is investigated by an incorruptible investigating officer. Firoze Mohammed IPS, an old admirer of Nandan, who is gathering evidences against Vishwanathan. Nandan is arrested by the police in a fabricated case and sacked from Kerala Reshmi. Meanwhile, Firoz decides to arrest Vishwanathan as he makes a drastic headway into the case. While arresting Vishwanathan, Firoz is killed by the latter and his henchmen. Nandan is released on bail and takes law into his hands, where he shoots down Vishwanathan and takes over as the new chief editor of Jagratha.

Cast

Reception
The film collected over 5.15 crore in 25 days at the box office. It became a blockbuster and was the second highest grossing film of 1999 behind Friends. The film ran for over 250 days in theatres. The film was known for the controversies surrounding it when leading Malayalam dailies Malayala Manorama and Mathrubhumi boycotted the film for portraying them in bad light. Manju Warrier won the Asianet Film Award for Best Actress and her record setting fourth Filmfare Award for Best Actress - Malayalam for this film. Biju Menon won the Asianet Film Award for Best Supporting Actor for this film. The film's music and lyrics by S. P. Venkatesh and Gireesh Puthenchery, along with art direction By Sabu Pravadas and publicity designing by Gayathri Ashokan. The location of the film were shot in Ernakulam and surrounding places.

References

External links 
 

1999 films
1990s Malayalam-language films
Films directed by Joshiy
Journalism adapted into films
Films shot in Kochi